Aberdeen is a town in Moore County, North Carolina, United States. The population was 6,350 at the 2010 census.

History
Scottish emigrants were the first Europeans to settle the area beginning in 1745.  They were drawn to the area by bountiful hunting and virgin land, and they founded the communities of Bethesda and Blue's Crossing by the late 18th Century.

During the American Revolution, the people of what is now Aberdeen were generally Loyalists.  There were a few small skirmishes in the vicinity of Aberdeen, most notably the one at Ray's Mill Creek, in which Colonel Philip Alston of the House in the Horseshoe, who was in pursuit of Loyalist Colonel David Fanning, savagely beat Kenneth Black, a local who had acted as Fanning's guide through the area.

One of the earliest industries of Bethesda and Blue's Crossing was naval stores due to the abundance of pine trees in the area.  These goods were transported to market initially via the Cape Fear River to Wilmington, and later by plank road.

Over 1,500 residents of what is now Aberdeen participated in the Civil War.  Nearly one-third of the soldiers sent were killed, which decimated the labor supply.  After the Civil War, however, the Raleigh and Augusta Air Line Railroad connected the community of Blue's Crossing to the rest of the country, allowing them to sell their naval stores and timber to the rest of the country.

In 1877, a post office was established and Malcolm J. Blue was appointed postmaster.  Four years later, Allison F. Page bought numerous forested acres to build a rail line, as well as to clear the land for timber.  This land was later sold to James Walker Tufts for $1 an acre, and later became home of the historic golf resort, Pinehurst Resort.  Blue's Crossing's name was officially changed to the present Aberdeen in 1888.

In the early twentieth century, tobacco farming came to the town.  Aberdeen's proximity to Pinehurst resulted in a boom in the tourism and retirement industries, which remain a major part of the local economy today.

The Aberdeen Historic District, Bethesda Presbyterian Church, John Blue House, and Malcolm Blue Farm are listed on the National Register of Historic Places.

Geography
Aberdeen is located at  (35.138494, -79.427701).

Aberdeen Creek, a tributary to Drowning Creek (Lumber River), flows through the middle of Aberdeen.

Education
The following schools are located in Aberdeen:

The Academy of Moore County
Aberdeen Elementary School
Southern Middle School

In addition, the area is served by Pinecrest High School and Sandhills Community College.

Demographics

2020 census

As of the 2020 United States census, there were 8,516 people, 2,891 households, and 1,786 families residing in the town.

2000 census
As of the census of 2000, there were 3,400 people, 1,526 households, and 929 families residing in the town. The population density was 551.6 people per square mile (213.1/km). There were 1,655 housing units at an average density of 268.5 per square mile (103.7/km). The racial makeup of the town was 73.03% White, 21.76% African American, 0.94% Native American, 1.21% Asian, 1.76% from other races, and 1.29% from two or more races. Hispanic or Latino of any race were 3.97% of the population.

There were 1,526 households, out of which 25.2% had children under the age of 18 living with them, 46.4% were married couples living together, 11.9% had a female householder with no husband present, and 39.1% were non-families. 34.1% of all households were made up of individuals, and 15.9% had someone living alone who was 65 years of age or older. The average household size was 2.23 and the average family size was 2.83.

In the town, the population was spread out, with 22.1% under the age of 18, 8.2% from 18 to 24, 30.3% from 25 to 44, 21.4% from 45 to 64, and 18.0% who were 65 years of age or older. The median age was 38 years. For every 100 females, there were 90.1 males. For every 100 females age 18 and over, there were 85.4 males.

The median income for a household in the town was $31,911, and the median income for a family was $42,383. Males had a median income of $30,906 versus $23,403 for females. The per capita income for the town was $18,045. About 9.8% of families and 13.8% of the population were below the poverty line, including 13.5% of those under age 18 and 19.0% of those age 65 or over.

References

External links

Official town website

Towns in North Carolina
Towns in Moore County, North Carolina
Sandhills (Carolina)